Paopi 29 - Coptic Calendar - Hathor 1

The thirtieth day of the Coptic month of Paopi, the second month of the Coptic year.  On a common year, this day corresponds to October 27, of the Julian Calendar, and November 9, of the Gregorian Calendar. This day falls in the Coptic season of Peret, the season of emergence.

Commemorations

Saints 

 The departure of Saint Abraham of Menouf, the Hermit

Other commemorations 

 The appearance of the Holy Head of Saint Mark, and the consecration of his Church in Alexandria

References 

Days of the Coptic calendar